The Battle of Amba Alagi was the first in a series of battles between the Italian General Baratieri and Ethiopia's Emperor Menelik during the First Italo-Ethiopian War. Amba Alagi was one of Baratieri's forward positions; it was under the command of Major Toselli with 2,000 Eritrean Askari. On 7 December 1895, the Ras Makonnen, Fitawrari Gebeyehu and Ras Mengesha Yohannes commanded an assault of Menelik's vanguard that annihilated the Italians and killed Major Toselli.

The Ethiopians attacked a force of 350 Eritrean irregulars on the left flank, who collapsed under the Ethiopian assault, causing Toselli to send two companies of Italian infantry who halted the Ethiopian advance. Just as Toselli was rejoicing in his apparent victory, the main Ethiopian assault came down on his right flank, causing Toselli to order retreat. The Emperor's best general, Ras Makonnen, had occupied the road leading back to Eritrea, and launched a surprise attack, which routed the Italians. The Ethiopians had completely devastated the Italians, who suffered 19 Italian officers (including Maj Toselli), 20 Italian other ranks, and 1,500 ascari killed, and 3 officers and 300 ascari wounded.

However, the defeat at Amba Alagi did have a silver lining for Baratieri. Prime Minister Crispi's shocked cabinet agreed to advance another 20 million lire (£80,000) to ensure that a disaster could be stopped. This money allowed for a larger Italian disaster at the Battle of Adwa, halting Italian plans to annex Ethiopia.

References

Battles of the First Italo-Ethiopian War
Battles involving Ethiopia
Battles involving Italy
1895 in Ethiopia
Conflicts in 1895
December 1895 events